Ashwini was an Indian actress, primarily in Telugu and Tamil films. She appeared in more than 100 films in various South Indian languages.

Career
Making her debut as a child artiste in Bhakta Dhruva Markandeya and later shared screen space with Telugu stars, Balakrishna in Bhale Thammudu, Venkatesh in Kaliyuga Pandavulu, Rajendra Prasad in Station Master and Mohan Babu films. She acted in more than 110 films in languages including Telugu, Tamil, Kannada and Malayalam.

Filmography

Death
She died at the Sri Ramachandra Hospital in Chennai on 23 September 2012. She was reported to have had a liver-related illness.

R. Parthiepan  helped Ashwini's family to carry her body in an ambulance to Andhra. He also undertook to pay for the education of Ashwini's son Karthick.

References

External links
 

1967 births
Indian film actresses
Actresses in Tamil cinema
Actresses in Telugu cinema
Actresses in Kannada cinema
Actresses in Malayalam cinema
2012 deaths
Place of birth missing
Child actresses in Telugu cinema
20th-century Indian actresses
21st-century Indian actresses
Actresses from Chennai
People from Nellore district
Telugu people
Deaths from liver disease